Mill City may refer to:
Mill City, Mono County, California
Mill City, Oregon
Mill City, Nevada
nickname for Lowell, Massachusetts
nickname for Minneapolis, Minnesota